The Common Sense Group is an informal group of Conservative MPs in the United Kingdom who advocate a broad range of ideals that they think the Conservative Party and the country ought to be following.

The group was inspired by the euro-sceptic European Research Group and has published a book, Common Sense: Conservative Thinking for a Post-Liberal Age.

History
The Guardian said in November 2020 that the group "launched quietly in the summer with about 40 members  ... and now has 59 MPs and 7 members of the House of Lords in its ranks". Its president is Edward Leigh MP.

The Common Sense Group has been said to be a revival of the Cornerstone Group, which appeared to be inactive after the 2019 elections (the source of the Cornerstone "About" page shows a last modified date in 2018).

Following an interim report on the connections between colonialism and properties now in the care of the National Trust, including links with historic slavery, members of the group signed a letter to The Telegraph in November 2020. The letter accused the National Trust of being "coloured by cultural Marxist dogma, colloquially known as the woke agenda".

The group's manifesto, Common Sense: Conservative Thinking for a Post-Liberal Age, was published in May 2021. John Hayes MP wrote in the Preface, "With opportunities provided by Brexit, the time for a refreshed national conversation on the defining issues of our time – nationhood, community, migration, the rule of law and public order – is now."

Members

Members of the group include:

Members of Parliament:

Members of the House of Lords:

Others:

See also 
 Social class in the United Kingdom
 Blue Collar Conservativism

References

Conservative Party (UK) factions
Euroscepticism in the United Kingdom
Groups of British MPs
Organizations established in 2020
2020 establishments in the United Kingdom
Organisations associated with the Conservative Party (UK)
Right-wing politics in the United Kingdom
Right-wing populism in the United Kingdom